Criodrilus is a genus of annelids belonging to the family Criodrilidae.

The species of this genus are found in Europe and America.

Species:

Criodrilus aidae 
Criodrilus lacuum 
Criodrilus miyashitai 
Criodrilus venezuelanus

References

Annelids